Ryste may refer to:

 Bodil Ryste (b. 1979), Norwegian ski mountaineer and cross-country skier
 Ruth Anlaug Ryste (b. 1932), personal secretary to Norwegian ministers